Hills of Hate is a 1921 American silent Western film directed by Ben F. Wilson and starring Jack Hoxie, Wilbur McGaugh and Evelyn Nelson.

Cast
 Jack Hoxie as Nate 'Hate' Hammond
 Wilbur McGaugh as Frayne
 Evelyn Nelson as Ann La Varre
 Marin Sais as Carmen

References

External links
 

1921 films
1921 Western (genre) films
1920s English-language films
Films directed by Ben F. Wilson
Arrow Film Corporation films
Silent American Western (genre) films
1920s American films